is a 1938 Japanese historical period film directed by Hisatora Kumagai and released by Toho. It is an adaptation of the 1913 Japanese short story "Abe ichizoku" by Mori Ōgai.

Plot
Set during the Tokugawa period, Hosokawa Tadatoshi, feudal lord of the Higo Province, falls ill but forbids his vassals from committing seppuku after he dies. They all defy his request and after Abe Yaichi'emon, the last loyal holdout, also commits seppuku, Mitsunao, Tadatoshi's son and the new feudal lord, punishes the Abe clan for Yaichi'emon's disobedience.

Cast
Chōjūrō Kawarasaki as Matajuro Emoto
Kan'emon Nakamura as Ygobei
Shizue Yamagishi as Toshi
Masako Tsutsumi as Osaki
Emitaro Ichikawa as Yaichi'emon Abe
Kunitarō Kawarazaki
Kosaburō Tachibana as Gonbei
Shinzaburo Ichikawa as Ichitayu
Daisuke Katō
Kosaburo Hashi
Shimajiro Yamazaki as Gotayu
Yuko Ichinose

Production
The film is an adaptation of the 1913 short story "Abe ichizoku" by Mori Ōgai (translated into English under the titles The Abe Family as well as The Abe Clan), which was inspired by the junshi loyalty suicides committed by the Russo-Japanese War hero General Nogi Maresuke and his wife on the day of the funeral of Emperor Meiji. The same story was again adapted into a television film in 1995 directed by Kinji Fukasaku.

References

External links

1938 films
1930s Japanese films
1930s historical drama films
Japanese historical drama films
1930s Japanese-language films
Jidaigeki films
Films set in the 1640s
Samurai films
Toho films
Films set in Kumamoto Prefecture
Films about suicide
Films based on short fiction
Japanese black-and-white films
1938 drama films